Dr. Slump is a Japanese manga series, written and illustrated by Akira Toriyama. It was serialized in Weekly Shōnen Jump from issue No. 5/6 on February 4, 1980 to No. 39 on September 10, 1984. It received the 1981 Shogakukan Manga Award in the shōnen and shōjo category. The series follows the humorous adventures of the little girl robot Arale Norimaki, her creator Senbei Norimaki, and the other residents of the bizarre Penguin Village.

The 236 individual chapters were collected by Shueisha into 18 tankōbon volumes, which were published from August 9, 1980 to May 10, 1985. The series was reassembled into 9 aizōban volumes in 1990, and published as 9 bunkoban volumes from July 18, 1995 to April 18, 1996. Between October 4, 2006 and November 2, 2007, it was re-released as 15 kanzenban volumes. Dr. Slump was adapted into a 243 episodes anime series by Toei Animation titled Dr. Slump - Arale-chan, which aired on Fuji TV from to 1981 to 1986. A second anime, simply titled Doctor Slump, ran from 1997 to 1999 for 74 episodes.

Viz Media began publishing an English adaptation of Dr. Slump in 2005 with translation done by Alexander O. Smith and some censorship. All 18 original volumes have been released in North America as of May 5, 2009.



Volume list

References

External links
 

Chapters
Dr. Slump